"Untitled 07 | 2014–2016" (stylized "untitled 07 | 2014–2016"), single version titled "Untitled 07 | Levitate" (stylized "untitled 07 | levitate"), is a song by American hip hop recording artist Kendrick Lamar, taken from his 2016 compilation album, untitled unmastered. On March 23, 2016, "untitled 07 | levitate" was released separately on the iTunes Store as the compilation's lead single.

Production
The song was produced by Cardo, Yung Exclusive, Frank Dukes, Swizz Beatz and Egypt Daoud. Swizz Beatz has said that his and Alicia Keys' 5-year-old son Egypt, produced "untitled 07". TDE producer Sounwave has confirmed on Twitter that Egypt produced the second half of the track.

Chart performance
On the chart dated March 26, 2016, "Untitled 07 | 2014–2016" entered the Billboard Hot 100 at number 90, powered by first-week digital download sales of 21,806 copies. It is the fifth longest song to chart on the Hot 100.

Track listing 
Digital download
"untitled 07 | levitate" (Explicit) — 2:26
Digital download
"untitled 07 | 2014 - 2016" (Explicit) — 8:16

Live performance
Kendrick Lamar performed the song at the NCAA March Madness Musical Festival in Houston on April 2, 2016. The song has been performed live at every show on the Damn tour.

Charts

References

2016 singles
2016 songs
Kendrick Lamar songs
Songs written by Kendrick Lamar
Song recordings produced by Swizz Beatz
Songs written by Swizz Beatz
Top Dawg Entertainment singles
Aftermath Entertainment singles
Interscope Records singles
Song recordings produced by Cardo (record producer)